Emir Tintiş (born 12 January 2004) is a Turkish professional footballer who plays as a left-back for Fatih Karagümrük.

Professional career
Tintiş is a youth product of the academies of Beşiktaş, Edirne DSİspor, and Galatasaray. After a strong season with the development side of Galatasaray, he was not offered a contract and decided to leave the club. On 14 June 2022 he signed a professional contract with Fatih Karagümrük in the Süper Lig.

He made his professional and Süper Lig debut as a starter in a 4–2 loss to Alanyaspor on 7 August 2022.

International career
Tintiş is a youth international for Turkey, having played up to the Turkey U18s where he was the captain.

References

External links
 
 

2004 births
Living people
Sportspeople from Edirne
Turkish footballers
Turkey youth international footballers
Fatih Karagümrük S.K. footballers
Süper Lig players
TFF First League players
Association football fullbacks